Kinesin family member 6 is a protein that in humans is encoded by the KIF6 gene. This gene encodes a member of the kinesin family of proteins. Members of this family are part of a multisubunit complex that functions as a microtubule motor in intracellular organelle transport.

References

Further reading 

 
 
 
 
 
 
 
 
 

Proteins